The 1996–97 Spartan League season was 79th and the last in the history of Spartan League.

At the end of the season the league was merged with South Midlands League to form Spartan South Midlands Football League. For the first season of the new league clubs from the South Midlands League and the Spartan League were separated: all the Spartan League Premier Division clubs formed Spartan South Midlands League Premier Division South, while clubs from Spartan League Division One and Division Two formed Spartan South Midlands League Division One South. Following first season of the new league regional Premier divisions and divisions One were merged.

Premier Division

The Premier Division featured 13 clubs which competed in the division last season, along with four new clubs:
Harefield United, resigned from the Isthmian League
Islington St Mary's, promoted from Division One
Ruislip Manor, resigned from the Isthmian League
Woodford Town, promoted from Division One

Also, Tufnell Park changed name to Haringey Borough.

League table

Division One

Division One featured seven clubs which competed in the division last season, along with two new clubs, promoted from Division Two:
AC Milla
Classic Inter

Also, Walthamstow Trojan changed name to Trojan.

League table

Division Two

Division Two featured six clubs which competed in the division last season, along with three new clubs:
Doddinghurst
Leyton Sports
Odua United

League table

References

1996-97
8